Islomjon Bakhromov (born 17 July 1995) is an Uzbekistani Greco-Roman wrestler. He won the gold medal in the men's 60 kg event at the 2019 Asian Wrestling Championships held in Xi'an, China.

Career 

At the 2017 Asian Indoor and Martial Arts Games held in Ashgabat, Turkmenistan, he won one of the bronze medals in the 59 kg event.

In 2018, he competed in the 60 kg event at the Asian Games in Jakarta, Indonesia where he lost his bronze medal match against Mehrdad Mardani of Iran.

In 2021, he won the gold medal in the 60 kg event at the Grand Prix Zagreb Open held in Zagreb, Croatia. In 2022, he won the gold medal in the 63 kg event at the Vehbi Emre & Hamit Kaplan Tournament held in Istanbul, Turkey.

Achievements

References

External links 
 

Living people
1995 births
Place of birth missing (living people)
Uzbekistani male sport wrestlers
Wrestlers at the 2018 Asian Games
Asian Games competitors for Uzbekistan
Asian Wrestling Championships medalists
Islamic Solidarity Games medalists in wrestling
Islamic Solidarity Games competitors for Uzbekistan
21st-century Uzbekistani people